This is a list of airlines currently operating in Nicaragua.

See also
List of defunct airlines of Nicaragua
List of airlines

References

Nicaragua
Airlines
Airlines
Nicaragua